California's 26th State Senate district is one of 40 California State Senate districts. It is currently represented by Democrat Ben Allen of Santa Monica.

District profile 
The district includes much of the Westside and South Bay regions of Los Angeles County. It also encompasses the southern Channel Islands, including Santa Catalina Island and San Clemente Island.

Los Angeles County – 9.4%
 Beverly Hills
 El Segundo
 Hermosa Beach
 Los Angeles – 11.9%
 Bel Air
 Beverly Park
 Brentwood
 Fairfax
 Hancock Park
 Hollywood – partial
 Hollywood Hills West
 Holmby Hills
 Miracle Mile – partial
 Pacific Palisades
 Playa del Rey
 Playa Vista
 Venice
 Westchester – partial
 Westwood
 Manhattan Beach
 Marina del Rey
 Rancho Palos Verdes
 Redondo Beach
 Rolling Hills Estates
 Santa Monica
 Torrance – 55.0%
 West Hollywood

Election results from statewide races

List of senators 
Due to redistricting, the 26th district has been moved around different parts of the state. The current iteration resulted from the 2011 redistricting by the California Citizens Redistricting Commission.

Election results 1994 - present

2018

2014

2013 (special)

2010

2009 (special)

2006

2002

1998

1994

See also 
 California State Senate
 California State Senate districts
 Districts in California

References

External links 
 District map from the California Citizens Redistricting Commission

26
Government of Los Angeles County, California
Government of Los Angeles
Westside (Los Angeles County)
Bel Air, Los Angeles
Beverly Hills, California
Brentwood, Los Angeles
Channel Islands of California
El Segundo, California
Fairfax, Los Angeles
Hermosa Beach, California
Hollywood, Los Angeles
Hollywood Hills
Holmby Hills, Los Angeles
Lomita, California
Manhattan Beach, California
Mar Vista, Los Angeles
Marina del Rey, California
Pacific Palisades, Los Angeles
Palos Verdes Peninsula
Playa del Rey, Los Angeles
Playa Vista, Los Angeles
Rancho Park, Los Angeles
Redondo Beach, California
Santa Monica, California
Santa Monica Mountains
South Bay, Los Angeles
Torrance, California
Venice, Los Angeles
West Hollywood, California
West Los Angeles
Westchester, Los Angeles
Westwood, Los Angeles